Lieutenant General Tariq Waseem Ghazi  is a retired lieutenant general in the Pakistan Army who served as the 23rd secretary of defense to the government of Pakistan, 21st president of the National Defence University, and commandant of the Command and Staff College.

Career 
Ghazi was commissioned in the Baloch Regiment in 1967. He obtained MS degree in war studies from the National Defence University, Pakistan. After retiring from the military, he was appointed as defense secretary in the ministry of Defence from May 2005 to April 2007.

Prior to his appointment at the ministry of defence, Ghazi served as a military observer for the United Nations Observer Mission in Georgia in 1998.

Awards and decorations

Foreign decorations

References 

Defence Secretaries of Pakistan
Baloch Regiment officers
Recipients of Hilal-i-Imtiaz
Pakistani generals
National Defence University, Pakistan alumni
Date of birth missing (living people)
Place of birth missing (living people)